Boer is a Dutch occupational surname meaning "farmer". Variants are Boere, Boeres, Boers, Den Boer and most commonly De Boer. People with this surname include:

Boer
Albert Boer (1935–2002), Dutch writer
Dick Boer (born 1957), Dutch businessman, CEO of Ahold Delhaize
 (born 1939), Dutch theologist
Diederik Boer (born 1980), Dutch football goalkeeper
Geert Egberts Boer (1832–1904), Dutch-born American college president
Jan Gerard Wessels Boer (born 1936), Dutch plant taxonomist 
 (1907–1993), Dutch novelist
Jonnie Boer (born 1985), Dutch chef
Margot Boer (born 1985), Dutch speed skater
Moreno Boer (born 1977), Italian weightlifter
Richard Constant Boer (1863–1929), Dutch scholar of Old Norse
Robbert-Kees Boer (born 1981), Dutch speed skater
Thorsten Boer (born 1969), German football striker and manager
Kristine Boers

Boër / Böer
Johann Lucas Boër (1751–1835), German doctor
Karl Wolfgang Böer (born 1926), German solar energy pioneer
Roland Böer (born 1970), German conductor and festival manager

Boere / Boeres
Emile Boeres (1890–1944), Luxembourg composer, organist and choir master
Heinrich Boere (1921–2013), Dutch-German soldier
Remco Boere (born 1961), Dutch football striker, brother of Jeroen
Jeroen Boere (1967–2007), Dutch football striker, brother of Remco
Tom Boere (born 1992), Dutch football striker
Boers
Christiaan Boers (1889–1942), Royal Netherlands Army soldier
Edward William Boers (1884–1929), United States Navy sailor
 (born 1989), Dutch rower
Robin Boers (born 1940s), Canadian drummer
Van Boer
Bertil H. van Boer (born 1982), American musicologist

See also
De Boer, Dutch surname
Bauer (surname), German equivalent

References

Dutch-language surnames
Occupational surnames